Manol Chapov (born 25 January 1996) is a Bulgarian retired footballer who last played as a midfielder for Pirin Blagoevgrad.

References

External links
 

1996 births
Living people
Bulgarian footballers
First Professional Football League (Bulgaria) players
Association football midfielders
OFC Pirin Blagoevgrad players
Sportspeople from Blagoevgrad